Empire of the Moghul is a series of historical fiction novels written by Alex Rutherford (the pen name for Diana and Michael Preston). The series consists of six volumes covering the rise and height of the Moghul Empire in medieval India.

Books

Adaptations

Television 

The Empire is an Indian television adaptation of the books created by Nikkhil Advani for Disney+ Hotstar. The first season of the series adapts first volume of the novel series and stars Kunal Kapoor, Drashti Dhami, Shabana Azmi, and Dino Morea among others. The first season debuted on August 27, 2021 on Disney+ Hotstar and Hotstar globally.

References

External links
Empire of the Moghul Website

Historical novels
Books about the Mughal Empire
Mughal Empire in fiction
Cultural depictions of Akbar
Cultural depictions of Jahangir
Cultural depictions of Shah Jahan
Cultural depictions of Aurangzeb
History books about the 16th  century